Galileo was an American robotic space program that studied the planet Jupiter and its moons, as well as several other Solar System bodies. Named after the Italian astronomer Galileo Galilei, the Galileo spacecraft consisted of an orbiter and an entry probe. It launched the first probe into Jupiter, directly measuring its atmosphere. Despite suffering major antenna problems, Galileo achieved the first asteroid flyby, of 951 Gaspra, and discovered the first asteroid moon, Dactyl, around 243 Ida. In 1994, Galileo observed Comet Shoemaker–Levy 9's collision with Jupiter.

Jupiter's atmospheric composition and ammonia clouds were recorded. Io's volcanism and plasma interactions with Jupiter's atmosphere were also recorded. The data Galileo collected supported the theory of a liquid ocean under the icy surface of Europa, and there were indications of similar liquid-saltwater layers under the surfaces of Ganymede and Callisto. Ganymede was shown to possess a magnetic field and the spacecraft found new evidence for exospheres around Europa, Ganymede, and Callisto. Galileo also discovered that Jupiter's faint ring system consists of dust from impacts on the four small inner moons. The extent and structure of Jupiter's magnetosphere was also mapped.

Background
Jupiter is the largest planet in the Solar System, with more than twice the mass of all the other planets combined.  Consideration of sending a probe to Jupiter began as early as 1959, when the National Aeronautics and Space Administration (NASA) Jet Propulsion Laboratory (JPL) developed four mission concepts:
 Deep space flights would fly through interplanetary space;
 Flyby missions would fly past planets, and could visit multiple planets on a single mission;
 Orbiter missions would place a probe in orbit around a planet for detailed study;
 Planetary entry and lander missions, which would explore the atmosphere and surface.

Two missions to Jupiter, Pioneer 10 and Pioneer 11, were approved in 1969, with NASA's Ames Research Center given responsibility for planning the missions. Pioneer 10 was launched in March 1972 and passed within  of Jupiter in December 1973. It was followed by Pioneer 11, which was launched in April 1973, and passed within  of Jupiter in December 1974, before heading on to an encounter with Saturn. They were followed by the more advanced Voyager 1 and Voyager 2 spacecraft, which were launched on 5 September and 20 August 1977 respectively, and reached Jupiter in March and July 1979.

Planning

Initiation
Following the approval of the Voyager missions, NASA's Scientific Advisory Group (SAG) for Outer Solar System Missions considered the requirements for Jupiter orbiters and atmospheric probes. It noted that the technology to build a heat shield for an atmospheric probe did not yet exist, and indeed facilities to test one under the conditions found on Jupiter would not be available until 1980. There was also concern about the effects of radiation on spacecraft components, which would be better understood after Pioneer 10 and Pioneer 11 had conducted their flybys. These indicated that the effects were less severe than feared. NASA management designated the JPL as the lead center for the Jupiter Orbiter Probe (JOP) Project. John R. Casani, who had headed the Mariner and Voyager projects, became the first project manager. The JOP would be the fifth spacecraft to visit Jupiter, but the first to orbit it, and the probe would be the first to enter its atmosphere.

An important decision made at this time by Ames and the JPL was to use a Mariner program spacecraft like that used for Voyager for the Jupiter orbiter, rather than a Pioneer. Pioneer was stabilized by spinning the spacecraft at 60 rpm, which gave a 360-degree view of the surroundings, and did not require an attitude control system. By contrast, Mariner had an attitude control system with three gyroscopes and two sets of six nitrogen jet thrusters. Attitude was determined with reference to the Sun and Canopus, which were monitored with two primary and four secondary sensors. There was also an inertial reference unit and an accelerometer. This allowed it to take high resolution images, but the functionality came at a cost of increased weight. A Mariner weighed  compared to just  for a Pioneer.

The Voyager spacecraft had been launched by Titan IIIE rockets with a Centaur upper stage, but Titan was retired afterwards. In the late 1970s, NASA was focused on the development of the reusable Space Shuttle, which was expected to make expendable rockets obsolete. In late 1975, NASA decreed that all future planetary missions would be launched by the Space Shuttle. The JOP would be the first to do so. The Space Shuttle was supposed to have the services of a space tug to launch payloads requiring something more than a low Earth orbit, but this was never approved. The United States Air Force then developed the solid-fueled Interim Upper Stage (IUS), later renamed the Inertial Upper Stage (with the same acronym), for the purpose.

The IUS was not powerful enough to launch a payload to Jupiter without resorting to using a series of gravitational slingshot maneuvers around planets to garner additional speed, something most engineers regarded as inelegant, and which planetary scientists at JPL disliked because it meant that the mission would take months or years longer to reach Jupiter. Longer travel times meant that components would age and the onboard power supply and propellant would be depleted. Some of the gravity assist options also meant flying closer to the Sun, which would induce thermal stresses. This was sufficient for most satellites. It could also be configured with two large stages to launch multiple satellites. A configuration with three stages, two large and one small, would be enough for a planetary mission, so NASA contracted with Boeing for the development of a three-stage IUS.

It was estimated that the JOP would cost $634 million (equivalent to $ million in ), and it had to compete for fiscal year 1978 funding with the Space Shuttle and the Hubble Space Telescope. A successful lobbying campaign secured funding for both JOP and Hubble over the objections of Senator William Proxmire, the chairman of the Independent Agencies Appropriations Subcommittee. The United States Congress approved funding for the Jupiter Orbiter Probe on July 12, 1977, and JOP officially commenced on October 1, 1977, the start of the fiscal year. Casani solicited suggestions for a more inspirational name for the project, and the most votes went to "Galileo" after Galileo Galilei, the first person to view Jupiter through a telescope, and the discoverer of what is now known as the Galilean moons in 1610. It was noted that the name was also that of a spacecraft in the Star Trek television show. The new name was adopted in February 1978.

Preparation
To enhance reliability and reduce costs, the Galileo project's engineers decided to switch from a pressurized atmospheric entry probe to a vented one. This added  to its weight. Another  was added in structural changes to improve reliability. This would require additional fuel in the IUS.

Lifting Galileo and the IUS would require the use of the special lightweight version of the Space Shuttle external tank, the Space Shuttle orbiter stripped of all non-essential equipment, and the Space Shuttle main engines (SSME) running at full power—109 percent of their rated power level. Running at this power level necessitated the development of a more elaborate engine cooling system. By 1980, delays in the Space Shuttle program pushed the launch date for Galileo back to 1984. While a Mars slingshot was still possible in 1984, it would no longer be sufficient.

NASA decided to split Galileo into two separate spacecraft, an atmospheric probe and a Jupiter orbiter, with the orbiter launched in February 1984 and the probe following a month later. The orbiter would be in orbit around Jupiter when the probe arrived, allowing it to perform its role as a relay. Separating the two spacecraft required a second mission and a second carrier to be built for the probe, and was estimated to cost an additional $50 million (equivalent to $ million in ), but NASA hoped to be able to recoup some of this through separate completive bidding on the two. The problem was that while the atmospheric probe was light enough to launch with the two-stage IUS, the Jupiter orbiter was too heavy to do so, even with a gravity assist from Mars, so the three-stage IUS was still required.

By late 1980, the price tag for the IUS had risen to $506 million (equivalent to $ million in ). The USAF could absorb this cost overrun (and indeed had anticipated that it might cost far more), but NASA was faced with a quote of $179 million (equivalent to $ million in ) for the development of the three-stage version, which was $100 million (equivalent to $ million in ) more than it had budgeted for. At a press conference on January 15, 1981, NASA Administrator Robert A. Frosch announced that NASA was withdrawing support for the three-stage IUS, and going with a Centaur G Prime upper stage because "no other alternative upper stage is available on a reasonable schedule or with comparable costs."

Centaur provided many advantages over the IUS. The main one was that it was far more powerful. The probe and orbiter could be recombined, and the probe could be delivered directly to Jupiter in two years' flight time. The second was that despite this, it was also more gentle than the IUS, as it had lower thrust, thereby minimizing the chance of damage to the payload. Thirdly, unlike solid-fuel rockets which burned to completion once ignited, Centaur could be switched off and on again. This gave it flexibility, which increased the chances of a successful mission, and permitted options like asteroid flybys. Centaur was proven and reliable, whereas the IUS had not yet flown. The only concern was about safety; solid-fuel rockets were considered safer than liquid-fuel ones, especially ones containing liquid hydrogen.

In February 1981, the JPL learned that the Office of Management and Budget (OMB) was planning major cuts to NASA's budget, and was considering cancelling Galileo. What saved it from cancellation was the intervention of the USAF. The JPL had considerable experience with autonomous spacecraft. This was a necessity for deep space probes, since a signal from Earth takes anything from 35 to 52 minutes to reach Jupiter. The USAF was interested in providing this capability for its satellites so that they would be able to determine their attitude using onboard systems rather than relying on ground stations, which were not "hardened" against nuclear attacks, and could take evasive action in the face of anti-satellite weapons. It was also interested in the manner in which the JPL was designing Galileo to withstand the intense radiation of the magnetosphere of Jupiter. On February 6, 1981 Strom Thurmond, the President pro tempore of the Senate, wrote directly to David Stockman, the Director of the OMB, arguing that Galileo was vital to the nation's defense.

In December 1984 Casani proposed adding a flyby of asteroid 29 Amphitrite to the Galileo mission. In plotting a course to Jupiter, the engineers were concerned to avoid asteroids. Little was known about them at the time, and it was suspected that they could be surrounded by dust particles. Flying through a dust cloud could damage the spacecraft's optics and possibly the spacecraft itself. To be safe, the JPL wanted to avoid asteroids by at least . Most of the asteroids in the vicinity of the flight path like 1219 Britta and 1972 Yi Xing were only a few kilometers in diameter and posed little value when observed from a safe distance, but 29 Amphitrite was one of the largest of the asteroids, and a flyby at even  could have great scientific value. The flyby would delay the spacecraft's arrival in Jupiter orbit from August 29 to December 10, 1988, and the expenditure of propellant would reduce the number of orbits of Jupiter from eleven to ten. This was expected to add $20 to $25 million (equivalent to $ to $ million in ) to the cost of the Galileo project. The 29 Amphitrite flyby was approved by NASA Administrator James M. Beggs on December 6, 1984.

During testing, contamination was discovered in the system of metal slip rings and brushes used to transmit electrical signals around the spacecraft, and they were returned to be refabricated. The problem was traced back to a chlorofluorocarbon used to clean parts after soldering. It had been absorbed, and was then released in a vacuum environment. It mixed with debris generated as the brushes wore down, and caused intermittent problems with electrical signal transmission. Problems were also detected in the performance of memory devices in an electromagnetic radiation environment. The components were replaced, but then a read disturb problem arose, in which reads from one memory location disturbed those in adjacent locations. This was found to have been caused by the changes made to make the components less sensitive to electromagnetic radiation. Each component had to be removed, retested, and replaced. All of the spacecraft components and spare parts received a minimum of 2,000 hours of testing. The spacecraft was expected to last for at least five years—long enough to reach Jupiter and perform its mission. On December 19, 1985, it departed the JPL in Pasadena, California, on the first leg of its journey, a road trip to the Kennedy Space Center in Florida. The Galileo mission was scheduled for STS-61-G on May 20, 1986, using .

Reconsideration
On January 28, 1986,  lifted off on the STS-51-L mission. A failure of the solid rocket booster 73 seconds into flight tore the spacecraft apart, resulting in the deaths of all seven crew members. The Space Shuttle Challenger disaster was America's worst space disaster up to that time. The immediate impact on the Galileo project was that the May launch date could not be met because the Space Shuttles were grounded while the cause of the disaster was investigated. When they did fly again, Galileo would have to compete with high priority Department of Defense launches, the tracking and data relay satellite system, and the Hubble Space Telescope. By April 1986, it was expected that the Space Shuttles would not fly again before July 1987 at the earliest, and Galileo could not be launched before December 1987.

The Rogers Commission handed down its report on June 6, 1986. It was critical of NASA's safety protocols and risk management. In particular, it noted the hazards of Centaur-G stage. On June 19, 1986, NASA Administrator James C. Fletcher canceled the Shuttle-Centaur project. This was only partly due to the NASA management's increased aversion to risk in the wake of the Challenger disaster; NASA management also considered the money and manpower required to get the Space Shuttle flying again, and decided that there was insufficient resources to resolve lingering issues with Shuttle-Centaur as well. The changes to the Space Shuttle proved more extensive than anticipated, and in April 1987 the JPL was informed that Galileo could not be launched before October 1989. The Galileo spacecraft was shipped back to the JPL.

Without Centaur, it looked like there would not be any means of getting the spacecraft to Jupiter,  and it looked for a time like its next trip would be to the Smithsonian Institution. The cost of keeping it ready to fly in space was reckoned at $40 to $50 million per year (equivalent to $ to $ million in ), and the estimated cost of the whole project had blown out to $1.4 billion (equivalent to $ billion in ).

At the JPL, the Galileo Mission Design Manager and Navigation Team Chief, Robert Mitchell, assembled a team that consisted of Dennis Byrnes, Louis D'Amario, Roger Diehl and himself, to see if they could find a trajectory that would get Galileo to Jupiter using only a two-stage IUS. Roger Diehl came up with the idea of using a series of gravitational slingshots to provide the additional velocity required to reach Jupiter. This would require Galileo to fly past Venus, and then past Earth twice. This was referred to as the Venus-Earth-Earth Gravity Assist (VEEGA) trajectory.

The reason no one had thought of it before was that the second encounter with Earth would not give the spacecraft any extra energy. Diehl realised that this was not necessary; the second encounter with Earth would merely change its direction to put it on a course for Jupiter. In addition to increasing the flight time to six years, the VEEGA trajectory had an additional drawback from the point of view of NASA Deep Space Network (DSN): Galileo would arrive at Jupiter when it was at the maximum range from Earth, and maximum range meant minimum signal strength. Furthermore, it would have a southerly declination of −23 degrees instead of a northerly one of +18 degrees, so the main tracking station would be the Canberra Deep Space Communication Complex in Australia, with its two 34-meter and one 70-meter antennae. This was supplemented the 64-meter antenna at the Parkes Observatory.

Initially it was thought that the VEEGA trajectory demanded a November launch, but D'Amario and Byrnes calculated that a mid-course correction between Venus and Earth would permit an October launch as well. Taking such a roundabout route meant that Galileo would require sixty months to reach Jupiter instead of just thirty, but it would get there. Consideration was given to using the USAF's Titan IV launch system with its Centaur G Prime upper stage. This was retained as a backup for a time, but in November 1988 the USAF informed NASA that it could not provide a Titan IV in time for the May 1991 launch opportunity, owing to the backlog of high priority Department of Defense missions. However, the USAF supplied IUS-19, which had originally been earmarked for a Department of Defense mission, for use by the Galileo mission.

As the launch date of Galileo neared, anti-nuclear groups, concerned over what they perceived as an unacceptable risk to the public's safety from the plutonium in the Galileo radioisotope thermoelectric generators (RTGs) and General Purpose Heat Source (GPHS) modules, sought a court injunction prohibiting Galileo launch. RTGs were necessary for deep space probes because they had to fly distances from the Sun that made the use of solar energy impractical. They had been used for years in planetary exploration without mishap: the Department of Defense's Lincoln Experimental Satellites 8/9 had 7 percent more plutonium on board than Galileo, and the two Voyager spacecraft each carried 80 percent of plutonium. By 1989, plutonium had been used in 22 spacecraft.

Activists remembered the crash of the Soviet Union's nuclear-powered Kosmos 954 satellite in Canada in 1978, and the Challenger disaster, while it did not involve nuclear fuel raised public awareness about spacecraft failures. No RTGs had ever done a non-orbital swing past the Earth at close range and high speed, as Galileo VEEGA trajectory required it to do. This created a novel mission failure modality that might plausibly have entailed dispersal of Galileo plutonium in the Earth's atmosphere. Scientist Carl Sagan, a strong supporter of the Galileo mission, wrote that "there is nothing absurd about either side of this argument."

Before the Challenger disaster, the JPL had conducted shock tests on the RTGs that indicated that they could withstand a pressure of  without a failure, which would have been sufficient to withstand an explosion on the launch pad. The possibility of adding additional shielding was considered but rejected, mainly because it would add an unacceptable amount of extra weight. After the Challenger disaster, NASA commissioned a study on the possible effects if such an event occurred with Galileo on board. Angus McRonald, a JPL engineer, concluded that what would happen would depend on the altitude at which the Space Shuttle broke up. NASA concluded that the chance of such a disaster was 1 in 2,500, although anti-nuclear groups thought it might be as high as 1 in 430. The risk to an individual would be 1 in 100 million, about two orders of magnitude less than the danger of being killed by lightning.

Launch

STS-34 was the mission designated to launch Galileo, scheduled for October 12, 1989, in the Space Shuttle Atlantis. The spacecraft was delivered to the Kennedy Space Center by a high-speed truck convoy that departed the JPL in the middle of the night. There were fears that the spacecraft might be hijacked by anti-nuclear activists or terrorists, so the route was kept secret from the drivers, who drove through the night and the following day and only stopped for food and fuel.

Last minute efforts by three environmental groups to halt the launch were rejected by the District of Columbia Circuit. In a concurring opinion, Chief Justice Patricia Wald wrote that while the legal challenge was not frivolous, there was no evidence that NASA had acted improperly in compiling the mission's environmental assessment, and the appeal was therefore denied on technical grounds. On October 16, eight protesters were arrested for trespassing at the Kennedy Space Center; three were jailed and the remaining five released.

The launch was twice delayed; first by a faulty main engine controller that forced a postponement to October 17, and then by inclement weather, which necessitated a postponement to the following day, but this was not a concern since the launch window extended until November 21. Atlantis finally lifted off at 16:53:40 UTC on October 18, and went into a  orbit. Galileo was successfully deployed at 00:15 UTC on October 19. Following the IUS burn, the Galileo spacecraft adopted its configuration for solo flight, and separated from the IUS at 01:06:53 UTC on October 19. Atlantis returned to Earth safely on October 23.

Venus encounter
The encounter with Venus on February 9 was in view of the DSN's Canberra and Madrid Deep Space Communications Complexes. Doppler data collected by the DSN allowed the JPL to verify that the gravitational assist maneuver had been successful, and the spacecraft had obtained the expected  increase in speed. Unfortunately, three hours into the flyby, the tracking station at Goldstone had to be shut down due to high winds, and Doppler data was lost.

Because Venus was much closer to the Sun than the spacecraft had been designed to operate, great care was taken to avoid thermal damage. In particular, the X-band high gain antenna (HGA) was not deployed, but was kept folded up like an umbrella and pointed away from the Sun to keep it shaded and cool. This meant that the two small S-band low gain antennae (LGA) had to be used instead. They had a maximum bandwidth of 1,200 bits per second compared to the 134,000 bit/s expected from the HGA. As the spacecraft moved further from Earth, it also necessitated the use of the DSN's  dishes, to the detriment of other users, who had lower priority than Galileo. Even so, the downlink telemetry rate fell to 40 bit/s within a few days of the Venus flyby, and by March it was down to just 10 bit/s.

Venus had been the focus of many automated flybys, probes, balloons and landers, most recently the Magellan spacecraft, and Galileo had not been designed with Venus in mind. Nonetheless, there were useful observations that it could make, as it carried some instruments that had never flown on spacecraft to Venus, such as the near-infrared mapping spectrometer (NIMS). Telescopic observations of Venus had revealed that there were certain parts of the infrared spectrum that the greenhouse gases in the Venusian atmosphere did not block, making them transparent on these wavelengths. This permitted the NIMS to both view the clouds and obtain maps of the equatorial and mid-latitudes of the night side of Venus with three to six times the resolution of Earth-based telescopes. The ultraviolet spectrometer (UVS) was also deployed to observe the Venusian clouds and their motions.

Another set of observations was conducted using Galileo's energetic particles detector (EPD) when Galileo moved through the bow shock caused by Venus's interaction with the solar wind. A search for lightning on Venus was conducted using the plasma wave detector, which noted nine bursts which were likely caused by lightning, but efforts to capture an image of lightning with the solid-state imaging system (SSI) were unsuccessful.

Earth encounters

Flybys
Galileo made two small course corrections on 9 to 12 April and 11 to 12 May 1990. This was only  higher than predicted, and the time of the closest approach was only a second off. It was the first time that a deep space probe had returned to Earth from interplanetary space. This time the spacecraft passed within a kilometer of its aiming point over the South Atlantic. This was so accurate that a scheduled course correction was cancelled, thereby saving  of propellant.

Earth's bow shock and the solar wind

The opportunity was taken to conduct a series of experiments. A study of Earth's bow shock was conducted as Galileo passed by Earth's day side. The magnetosphere was quite active at the time, and Galileo detected magnetic storms and whistlers caused by lightning strikes. The NIMS was employed to look for mesospheric clouds, which are believed to be caused by methane released by industrial processes. Normally they are only seen in September or October, but Galileo was able to detect them in December, an indication of damage to Earth's ozone layer.

Remote detection of life on Earth
The astronomer Carl Sagan, pondering the question of whether life on Earth could be easily detected from space, devised a set of experiments in the late 1980s using Galileo remote sensing instruments during the mission's first Earth flyby in December 1990. After data acquisition and processing, Sagan published a paper in Nature in 1993 detailing the results of the experiment. Galileo had indeed found what are now referred to as the "Sagan criteria for life". These included strong absorption of light at the red end of the visible spectrum (especially over continents) which was caused by absorption by chlorophyll in photosynthesizing plants, absorption bands of molecular oxygen which is also a result of plant activity, infrared absorption bands caused by the ~1 micromole per mole (μmol/mol) of methane in Earth's atmosphere (a gas which must be replenished by either volcanic or biological activity), and modulated narrowband radio wave transmissions uncharacteristic of any known natural source. Galileo experiments were thus the first ever controls in the newborn science of astrobiological remote sensing.

Galileo Optical Experiment
In December 1992, during Galileo second gravity-assist planetary flyby of Earth, another groundbreaking experiment was performed. Optical communications in space were assessed by detecting light pulses from powerful lasers with Galileo CCD. The experiment, dubbed Galileo Optical Experiment or GOPEX, used two separate sites to beam laser pulses to the spacecraft, one at Table Mountain Observatory in California and the other at the Starfire Optical Range in New Mexico. The Table Mountain site used a frequency doubled Nd:YAG laser operating at a wavelength of 532 nm, with a repetition rate of ~15 to 30 Hz and a pulse power full width at half maximum (FWHM) in the tens of megawatts range, which was coupled to a  Cassegrain telescope for transmission to Galileo. The Starfire range site used a similar setup with a larger, transmitting telescope.

Adverse weather conditions, restrictions placed on laser transmissions by the U.S. Space Defense Operations Center (SPADOC) and a pointing error caused by the scan platform acceleration on the spacecraft being slower than expected (which prevented laser detection on all frames with less than 400 ms exposure times) all contributed to the reduction of the number of successful detections of the laser transmission to 48 of the total 159 frames taken. Nonetheless, the experiment was considered a resounding success and the data acquired will likely be used in the future to design laser downlinks that will send large volumes of data very quickly from spacecraft to Earth. The scheme was studied in 2004 for a data link to a future Mars orbiting spacecraft.

Lunar observations

High gain antenna problem

Once Galileo headed beyond Earth, it was no longer risky to employ the HGA, so on April 11, 1991, Galileo was ordered to unfurl it. This was done using two small dual drive actuator (DDA) motors, and was expected to take 165 seconds, or 330 seconds if one failed. They would drive a worm gear. The antenna had 18 graphite-epoxy ribs, and when the driver motor started and put pressure on the ribs, they were supposed to pop out of the cup their tips were held in,  and the antenna would unfold like an umbrella. When it reached the fully deployed configuration, redundant microswitches would shut down the motors. Otherwise they would run for eight minutes before being automatically shut down to prevent them from overheating.

Through telemetry from Galileo, investigators determined that the electric motors had stalled at 56 seconds, the spacecraft's spin rate had decreased and its wobble had increased. Only 15 ribs had popped out, leaving the antenna looking like a lop-sided, half-open umbrella. The first suggestion was to re-fold the antenna and try the opening sequence again. This was not possible; although the motors were capable of running in reverse, the antenna was not designed for this, and human assistance was required when it was done on Earth to ensure that the wire mesh did not snag. It was later discovered that less torque was available from the DDA each time, so after five deploy and stow operations, the DDA torque was half its original value.

The first thing the Galileo team tried was to rotate the spacecraft away from the Sun and back again on the assumption that the problem was with friction holding the pins in their sockets. If so, then heating and cooling the ribs might cause them to pop out of their sockets. This was done seven times, but with no result. They then tried swinging LGA-2 (which faced in the opposite direction to the HGA and LGA-1) 145 degrees to a hard stop, thereby shaking the spacecraft. This was done six times with no effect. Finally, they tried shaking the antenna by pulsing the DDA motors at 1.25 and 1.875 Hertz. This increased the torque by up to 40 percent. The motors were pulsed 13,000 times over a three-week period in December 1992 and January 1993, but only managed to move the ballscrew by one and a half revolutions beyond the stall point.

Investigators concluded that during the 4.5 years that Galileo spent in storage after the Challenger disaster, the lubricants between the tips of the ribs and the cup were eroded and worn by vibration during the three cross-country journeys by truck between California and Florida for the spacecraft. The failed ribs were those closest to the flat-bed trailers carrying Galileo on these trips.  The use of land transport was partly to save costs—air transport would have cost an additional $65,000 or so per trip—but also to reduce the amount of handling required in loading and unloading the aircraft, which was considered a major risk of damage.  The spacecraft was also subjected to severe vibration in a vacuum environment by the IUS. Experiments on Earth with the test HGA showed that having a set of stuck ribs all on one side reduced the DDA torque produced by up to 40 percent.

The antenna lubricants were applied only once, nearly a decade before launch. Furthermore, the HGA was not subjected to the usual rigorous testing, because there was no backup unit that could be installed in Galileo in case of damage. The flight-ready HGA was never given a thermal evaluation test, and was unfurled only a half dozen or so times before the mission. But testing might not have revealed the problem; the Lewis Research Center was never able to replicate the problem on Earth, and it was assumed to be the combination of loss of lubricant during transportation, vibration during launch by the IUS, and a prolonged period of time in the vacuum of space where bare metal touching could undergo cold welding.

Fortunately, LGA-1 was capable of transmitting information back to Earth, although since it transmitted a signal isotropically, its bandwidth was significantly less than what the high-gain antenna's would have been; the high-gain antenna was to have transmitted at 134 kilobits per second, whereas LGA-1 was only intended to transmit at about 8 to 16 bits per second. LGA-1 transmitted with a power of about 15 to 20 watts, which by the time it reached Earth and had been collected by one of the large aperture 70-meter DSN antennas, had a total power of about 10 zeptowatts. Through the implementation of sophisticated technologies, the arraying of several Deep Space Network antennas and sensitivity upgrades to the receivers used to listen to Galileo signal, data throughput was increased to a maximum of 160 bits per second. By further using data compression, the effective bandwidth could be raised to 1,000 bits per second.

The data collected on Jupiter and its moons was stored in the spacecraft's onboard tape recorder, and transmitted back to Earth during the long apoapsis portion of the probe's orbit using the low-gain antenna. At the same time, measurements were made of Jupiter's magnetosphere and transmitted back to Earth. The reduction in available bandwidth reduced the total amount of data transmitted throughout the mission, but William J. O'Neil, Galileo project manager from 1992 to 1997, expressed confidence that 70 percent of Galileo science goals could still be met. The decision to use magnetic tape for storage was a conservative one, taken in the late 1970s when the use of tape was common. But conservatism was not restricted to engineers; a 1980 suggestion that the results of Galileo could be distributed electronically instead of on paper was regarded as ridiculous by geologists, on the grounds that storage would be prohibitively expensive; some of them thought that taking measurements on a computer involved putting a wooden ruler up to the screen.

Asteroid encounters

951 Gaspra

In all, 57 images of Gaspra were taken with the SSI, covering about 80% of the asteroid. Without the HGA, the bit rate was only about 40 bit/s, so an image took up to 60 hours to transmit back to Earth. The Galileo project was able to secure 80 hours of the Canberra's 70-meter dish time between 7 and 14 November 1991, but most of images taken, including low-resolution images of more of the surface, were not transmitted to Earth until November 1992.

Its shape was not remarkable for an asteroid of its size. Measurements were taken using the NIMS to indicate the asteroid's composition and physical properties. While Gaspra has plenty of small craters—over 600 of them ranging in size from —it lacks large ones, hinting at a relatively recent origin. However, it is possible that some of the depressions were eroded craters. Perhaps the most surprising feature was several relatively flat planar areas. Measurements of the solar wind in the vicinity of the asteroid showed it changing direction a few hundred kilometers from Gaspra, which hinted that it might have a magnetic field, but this was not certain.

243 Ida and Dactyl

Measurements were taken from Galileo using SSI and NIMS.

A competition was held to select a name for the moon, which was ultimately dubbed Dactyl after the legendary Dactyloi; craters on Dactyl were named after individual dactyloi. Regions on 243 Ida were named after cities where Johann Palisa, the discover of 243 Ida, made his observations, while ridges on 243 Ida were named in honor of deceased Galileo team members. Dactyl was the first asteroid moon discovered. Previously moons of asteroids had been assumed to be rare. The discovery of Dactyl hinted that they might in fact be quite common. From subsequent analysis of this data, Dactyl appeared to be an S-type asteroid, and spectrally different from 243 Ida. It was hypothesized that both may have been produced by the breakup of a Koronis parent body.

The requirement to use the LGA resulted in a bit rate of 40 bit/s, and that only from August 28 to September 29, 1993 and from February to June 1994. Galileo tape recorder was used to store images, but tape space was also required for the primary Jupiter mission. A technique was developed whereby only image fragments of two or three lines out of every 330 were initially sent. A determination could then be made as to whether the image was of 243 Ida or empty space. Ultimately, only about 16 percent of the SSI data recorded could be sent back to Earth.

Voyage to Jupiter

Comet Shoemaker–Levy 9 

Galileo prime mission was a two-year study of the Jovian system, but while it was en route, an unusual opportunity arose. On 26 March 1993, comet-seeking astronomers Carolyn S. Shoemaker, Eugene M. Shoemaker and David H. Levy discovered fragments of a comet orbiting Jupiter. They were the remains of a comet that had passed within the Roche limit of Jupiter, and had been torn apart by tidal forces. It was named Comet Shoemaker–Levy 9. Calculations indicated that it would crash into the planet sometime between 16 and 24 July 1994. While Galileo was still a long way from Jupiter, it was perfectly positioned to observe this event, whereas terrestrial telescopes had to wait to see the impact sites as they rotated into view because it would occur on Jupiter's night side.

The impact left a series of dark scars on the planet, some two or three times as large as the Earth, that persisted for weeks. When Galileo observed an impact in ultraviolet light, it lasted for about ten seconds, but in the infrared it persisted for 90 seconds or more. When a fragment hit the planet, it increased Jupiter's overall brightness by about 20 percent.

Probe deployment
The Galileo probe separated from the orbiter at 03:07 UTC on July 13, 1995, five months before its rendezvous with the planet on December 7. At this point, the spacecraft was still  from Jupiter, but  from Earth, and telemetry from the spacecraft, travelling at the speed of light, took 37 minutes to reach the JPL. A tiny Doppler shift in the signal of the order of a few centimeters per second indicated that the separation had been accomplished. The Galileo orbiter was still on a collision course with Jupiter. Previously, course corrections had been made using the twelve  thrusters, but with the probe on its way, the Galileo orbiter could now fire its  Messerschmitt-Bölkow-Blohm main engine which had been covered by the probe until then. At 07:38 UTC on July 27, it was fired for the first time to place the Galileo orbiter on course to enter orbit around Jupiter, whence it would perform as a communications relay for the Galileo probe. The Galileo probe's project manager, Marcie Smith at the Ames Research Center, was confident that this role could be performed by LGA-1.

Dust storms
In August 1995, the Galileo orbiter encountered a severe dust storm  from Jupiter that took several months to traverse. Normally the spacecraft's dust detector picked up a dust particle every three days; now it detected up to 20,000 particles a day. Interplanetary dust storms had previously been encountered by the Ulysses space probe, which had passed by Jupiter three years before on its mission to study the Sun's polar regions, but those encountered by Galileo were more intense. The dust particles were about the same size as those in cigarette smoke, and had speeds ranging from  depending on their size. The existence of the dust storms had come as a complete surprise to scientists. While data from both Ulysses and Galileo hinted that they originated somewhere in the Jovian system, it was a mystery how they had been created, and how they had escaped from Jupiter's strong gravitational and electromagnetic fields.

Tape recorder anomaly
The failure of Galileo high-gain antenna meant that data storage to the tape recorder for later compression and playback was absolutely crucial in order to obtain any substantial information from the flybys of Jupiter and its moons. This was a four-track, 114-megabyte digital tape recorder, manufactured by Odetics Corporation. On October 11, it was stuck in rewind mode for 15 hours before engineers learned what had happened and were able to send commands to shut it off. Although the recorder itself was still in working order, the malfunction had possibly damaged a length of tape at the end of the reel. This section of tape was declared "off limits" to any future data recording, and was covered with 25 more turns of tape to secure the section and reduce any further stresses, which could tear it. Because it happened only weeks before Galileo entered orbit around Jupiter, the anomaly prompted engineers to sacrifice data acquisition of almost all of the Io and Europa observations during the orbit insertion phase, in order to focus on recording data sent from the Jupiter probe descent.

Jupiter

Arrival
The Galileo orbiter's magnetometers reported that the spacecraft had encountered the bow wave of Jupiter's magnetosphere on November 16, 1995, when it was still  from Jupiter.

On December 7, 1995, the orbiter arrived in the Jovian system. That day it made a  flyby of Europa at 11:09 UTC, and then an  flyby of Io at 15:46 UTC, using Io's gravity to reduce its speed, and thereby conserve propellant for use later in the mission. At 19:54 it made its closest approach to Jupiter. The orbiter's electronics had been heavily shielded against radiation, but the radiation exceeded expectations, and nearly the spacecraft's design limits. One of the navigational systems failed, but the backup took over. Most robotic spacecraft respond to failures by entering safe mode and awaiting further instructions from Earth, but with a minimum of a two-hour signalling delay, this was not possible for Galileo.

Atmospheric probe

Meanwhile, the probe awoke in response to an alarm at 16:00 UTC and began powering up its instruments. It passed through the rings of Jupiter and encountered a previously undiscovered belt of radiation ten times as strong as Earth's Van Allen radiation belt. It entered Jupiter's atmosphere without any braking at 22:04 UTC on December 7, 1995. At this point it was moving at  relative to Jupiter. The atmosphere through which the probe descended was much denser and hotter than expected. Jupiter was also found to have only half the amount of helium expected and the data did not support the three-layered cloud structure theory: only one significant cloud layer was measured by the probe, at a pressure of around  but with many indications of smaller areas of increased particle densities along the whole length of the trajectory.

The probe slowed to subsonic speed within two minutes of entry. The data was not immediately relayed to Earth, but a single bit was transmitted from the orbiter as a notification that the signal from the probe was being received and recorded, which would then take days to arrive using the LGA.
The probe's  heat shield, making up almost half of the probe's total mass, lost  during the entry.

The atmospheric probe deployed its   parachute fifty-three seconds later than anticipated, resulting in a small loss of upper atmospheric readings. This was attributed to wiring problems with an accelerometer that determined when to begin the parachute deployment sequence. It then dropped its heat shield, which fell into Jupiter's interior. The signal from the probe was no longer detected by the orbiter after 61.4 minutes.

The probe's seven scientific instruments yielded a wealth of information. The probe detected very strong winds. The implication was that the winds are not produced by heat generated by sunlight or the condensation of water vapor (the main causes on Earth), but are due to an internal heat source. It was already well known that the atmosphere of Jupiter was mainly composed of hydrogen, but the clouds of ammonia and ammonium sulfide were much thinner than expected, and clouds of water vapor were not detected. This was the first observation of ammonia clouds in another planet's atmosphere. The atmosphere creates ammonia ice particles from material coming up from lower depths.
The probe detected less lightning, less water, but more winds than expected. It required a laborious analysis of the initial wind data from the probe to determine the actual measured wind speeds. No solid surface was detected during the  downward journey.

The abundance of nitrogen, carbon and sulfur was three times that of the Sun, raising the possibility that they had been acquired from other bodies in the Solar system, but the low abundance of water cast doubt on theories that Earth's water had been acquired from comets. There was far less lightning activity than expected, only about a tenth of the level of activity on Earth, but this was consistent with the lack of water vapor. More surprising was the high abundance of noble gases, argon, krypton and xenon, with abundances up to three times that found in the Sun.

Orbiter

With the probe data collected, the Galileo orbiter's next task was to slow down in order to avoid heading off into the outer solar system. The Galileo orbiter then became the first artificial satellite of Jupiter. Most of its initial 7-month long orbit was occupied transmitting the data from the probe back to Earth. When the orbiter reached its apojove on March 26, 1996, the main engine was fired again to increase the orbit from four times the radius of Jupiter to ten times. By this time the orbiter had received half the radiation allowed for in the mission plan, and the higher orbit was to conserve the instruments for as long as possible by limiting the radiation exposure.

The spacecraft traveled around Jupiter in elongated ellipses, each orbit lasting about two months. The differing distances from Jupiter afforded by these orbits allowed Galileo to sample different parts of the planet's extensive magnetosphere. The orbits were designed for close-up flybys of Jupiter's largest moons. A naming scheme was devised for the orbits: a code with the first letter of the moon being encountered on that orbit (or "J" if none was encountered) plus the orbit number.

Io
It is in orbital resonance with Ganymede and Europa, and tidally locked with Jupiter, so just as the Earth's Moon always has the same side facing Earth, Io always has the same side facing Jupiter. It orbits faster though, with a rotation period of 1.769 days. As a result, rotational and tidal forces are 220 times as great as those on Earth's moon. These frictional forces are sufficient to melt rock and create volcanoes and lava flows. Although only a third of the size of Earth, Io generates twice as much heat. While geological events occur on Earth over periods of thousands or even millions of years, cataclysmic events are common on Io. Visible changes occurred between orbits of Galileo. The colorful surface is a mixture of red, white and yellow sulphur compounds.

Galileo flew past Io on arrival day, but in the interest of protecting the tape recorder, O'Neil decided to forego collecting images. Only the fields and particles instruments were allowed to collect data, as these required the tape recorder to run at slow speeds, and it was believed that it could handle this, whereas the SSI camera required it to operate a high speed, with abrupt stops and starts. It was a crushing blow to scientists, some of whom had waited years for the opportunity. No other Io encounters were scheduled during the prime mission because it was feared that the high radiation levels close to Jupiter would damage the spacecraft. However, valuable information was still obtained; Doppler data used to measure Io's gravitational field revealed that Io had a core of molten iron and iron sulfide.

Another opportunity to observe Io arose during the GEM, when Galileo flew past Io on orbits I24 and I25, and it would revisit Io during the GMM, on orbits I27, I31, I32 and I33. As Galileo approached Io on I24 at 11:09 UTC on October 11, 1999, it entered safe mode. Apparently, high energy electrons had altered a bit on a memory chip. When it entered safe mode, the spacecraft turned off all non-essential functions. Normally it took seven to ten days to diagnose and recover from a safe mode incident; this time the Galileo Project team at the JPL had nineteen hours before the encounter with Io. After a frantic effort, they managed to diagnose a problem that had never been seen before, and restore the spacecraft systems with just two hours to spare. Not all of the planned activities could be carried out, but Galileo obtained a series of high-resolution color images of the Pillan Patera, and Zamama, Prometheus, and Pele volcanic eruption centers.

When Galileo next approached Io on I25 at 20:40 Pacific Time on November 25, 1999, the JPL were eating their Thanksgiving dinner at the Galileo Mission Control Center when, with the encounter with Io just four hours away, the spacecraft again entered safe mode. This time the problem was traced to a software patch implemented to bring Galileo out of safe mode during I24. Fortunately, the spacecraft had not shut down as much as it had on I24, and the team at JPL were able to bring it back online. During I24 they had done so with two hours to spare; this time, they had just three minutes. While such events were more common and spectacular on Io than on Earth, it was extremely fortuitous to have captured it.

The safe mode incidents on I24 and I25 left some gaps in the data, which I27 targeted. This time Galileo passed just  over the surface of Io. At this time, the spacecraft was nearly at the maximum distance from Earth, and there was a solar conjunction, a period when the Sun blocked the line of sight between Earth and Jupiter. As a consequence, three quarters of the observations were taken over a period of just three hours. NIMS images revealed fourteen active volcanoes in a region thought to contain just four. Images of Loki Patera showed that in the four and half months between I24 and I27, some  had been covered in fresh lava. Unfortunately, a series of observations of extreme ultraviolet (EUV) had to be cancelled due to yet another safe mode event. Radiation exposure caused a transient bus reset, a computer hardware error resulting in a safe mode event. A software patch implemented after the Europa encounter on orbit E19 guarded against this when the spacecraft was within 15 Jupiter radii of the planet, but this time it occurred at 29 Jupiter radii. The safe mode event also caused a loss of tape playback time, but the project managers decide to carry over some Io data into orbit G28, and play it back then. This limited the amount of tape space available for that Ganymede encounter, but the Io data was considered to be more valuable.

The discovery of Io's iron core raised the possibility that it had a magnetic field. The I24, I25 and I27 encounters had been on equatorial orbits, which made it difficult to determine whether Io had its own magnetic field, or one induced by Jupiter. Accordingly, on orbit I31, Galileo passed within  of the surface of the north pole of Io, and on orbit I32 it flew  over the south pole. After examining the magnetometer results, planetary scientist Margaret G. Kivelson, announced that Io had no intrinsic magnetic field, which meant that its molten iron core did not have the same convective properties as that of Earth. On I31 Galileo sped through an area that had been in the plume of the Tvashtar Paterae volcano, and it was hoped that the plume could be sampled. What had been assumed to be hot ash from the volcanic eruption turned out to be sulphur dioxide snowflakes, each consisting of 15 to 20 molecules clustered together. Galileo final return to Io on orbit I33 was marred by another safe mode incident. Although the project team worked hard to restore the spacecraft to working order, much of the hoped-for data was lost.

Europa

Observations from Earth indicated that it was covered in ice. Like Io, Europa is tidally locked with Jupiter. It is in orbital resonance with Io and Ganymede, with its 85-hour orbit being twice that of Io, but half that of Ganymede. Conjunctions with Io always occur on the opposite side of Jupiter to those with Ganymede. Europa is therefore subject to tidal effects. There is no evidence of volcanism like on Io, but Galileo revealed that the surface ice was covered in cracks.

Some observations of Europa were made during orbits G1 and G2. On C3, Galileo conducted a  "nontargeted" encounter of Europa on 6 November 1996. During E4 from 15 to 22 December 1996, Galileo flew within   of Europa, but data transmission was hindered by a Solar occultation that blocked transmission for ten days.

Occultations by Europa, Io and Jupiter provided data on the atmospheric profiles of Europa, Io and Jupiter, and measurements were made of Europa's gravitational field. On E11 from 2 to 9 November 1997, data was collected on the magnetosphere. Due to the problems with the HGA, only about two percent of the anticipated number of images of Europa were obtained by the primary mission. On the GEM, the first eight orbits, E12 through E19, were all dedicated to Europa, and Galileo paid it a final visit on E26 during the GMM.

Images of Europa also showed few impact craters. It seemed unlikely that it had escaped the meteor and comet impacts that scarred Ganymede and Callisto, so this indicated Europa has an active geology that renews the surface and obliterates craters. Clark Chapman argued that if we assume that a  crater occurs in Europa once every million years, and given that only about twenty have been spotted on Europa, the implication is that the surface must only be about 10 million years old. With more data on hand, in 2003 a team led Kevin Zahle at NASA's Ames Research Center arrived at a figure of 30 to 70 million years. But not all scientists were convinced; Michael Carr, a planetologist from the US Geological Survey, argued that, on the contrary, the surface of Europa was subjected to less impacts than Callisto or Ganymede.

Evidence of surface renewal hinted at the possibility of a viscous layer below the surface of warm ice or liquid water. NIMS observations by Galileo indicated that the surface of Europa appeared to contain magnesium and sodium salts. A likely source was brine below the ice crust. Further evidence was provided by the magnetometer, which reported that the magnetic field was induced by Jupiter. This could be explained by the existence of a spherical shell of conductive material like salt water. Since the surface temperature on Europa was a chilly , any water breaching the surface ice would instantly freeze over. Heat required to keep water in a liquid state could not come from the Sun, which had only 4 percent of the intensity of Earth, but ice is a good insulator, and the heat could be provided by the tidal flexing. Galileo also yielded evidence that the crust of Europa had slipped over time, moving south on the hemisphere facing Jupiter, and north on the far side.

There was acrimonious debate among scientists over the thickness of the ice crust, and those who presented results indicating that it might be thinner than the  proposed by the accredited scientists on the Galileo Imaging Team faced intimidation, scorn, and reduced career opportunities. The Galileo Imaging Team was led by Michael J. Belton from the Kitt Peak National Observatory. Scientists who planned imaging sequences had the exclusive right to the initial interpretation of the Galileo data, most which was performed by their research students. The scientific community did not want a repetition of the 1979 Morabito incident, when Linda A. Morabito, an engineer at the JPL working on Voyager 1, discovered the first active extraterrestrial volcano on Io. The Imaging Team controlled the manner in which discoveries were presented to the scientific community and the public through press conferences, conference papers and publications.

Observations by the Hubble Space Telescope in 1995 reported that Europa had a thin oxygen atmosphere. This was confirmed by Galileo in six experiments on orbits E4 and E6 during occultations when Europa was between Galileo and the Earth. This allowed Canberra and Goldstone to investigate the ionosphere of Europa by measuring the degree to which the radio beam was diffracted by charged particles. This indicated the presence of water ions, which were most likely water molecules that had been dislodged from the surface ice and then ionized by the Sun or the Jovian magnetosphere. The presence of an ionosphere was sufficient to deduce the existence of a thin atmosphere on Europa. On December 11, 2013, NASA reported, based on results from the Galileo mission, the detection of "clay-like minerals" (specifically, phyllosilicates), often associated with organic materials, on the icy crust of Europa. The presence of the minerals may have been the result of a collision with an asteroid or comet.

Ganymede

It is the largest of the moons in the Solar system that are characterized by large amounts of water ice, which also includes Saturn's moon Titan, and Neptune's moon Triton. Ganymede has three times as much water for its mass as Earth has.

When Galileo entered Jovian orbit, it did so at an inclination to the Jovian equator, and therefore the orbital plane of the four Galilean moons. To transfer orbit while conserving propellant, two slingshot maneuvers were performed. On G1, the gravity of Ganymede was used to slow the spacecraft's orbital period from 21 to 72 days to allow for more encounters and to take Galileo out of the more intense regions of radiation. On G2, the gravity assist was employed to put it into a coplanar orbit to permit subsequent encounters with Io, Europa and Callisto. Although the primary purpose of G1 and G2 was navigational, the opportunity to make some observations was not missed. This was the first time that a magnetic field had ever been detected on a moon contained within the magnetosphere of its host planet.

This discovery led naturally to questions about its origin. Galileo returned to Ganymede on orbits G7 and G9 in April and May 1997, and on G28 and G29 in May and December 2000 on the GMM. Images of the surface revealed two types of terrain: highly cratered dark regions, and grooved terrain sulcus. Images of the Arbela Sulcus taken on G28 made Ganymede look more like Europa, but tidal flexing could not provide sufficient heat to keep water in liquid form on Ganymede, although it may have made a contribution. Another possibility was volcanism. Slushy water or ice reaching the surface would quickly freeze over, creating areas of a relatively smooth surface.

Callisto

Callisto is the outermost of the Galilean moons, and the most pockmarked, indeed the most of any body in the Solar system. So many craters must have taken billions of years to accumulate, which gave scientists the idea that its surface was as much as four billion years old, and provided a record of meteor activity in the Solar system. Galileo visited Callisto on orbits C3, C9 and C100 during the prime mission, and then on C20, C21, C22 and C23 during the GEM. When the cameras observed Callisto close up, there was a puzzling absence of small craters. The surface features appeared to have been eroded, indicating that they had been subject to active geological processes.

Galileo flyby of Callisto on C3 marked the first time that the Deep Space Network operated a link between its antennae in Canberra and Goldstone that allowed them to operate as a gigantic array, thereby enabling a higher bit rate despite the spacecraft's long distance from Earth. With the assistance of the antenna at Parkes, this raised the effective bandwidth to as much as 1,000 bits per second.

Data accumulated on C3 indicated that Callisto had a homogeneous composition, with heavy and light elements intermixed. This was estimated to be composed of 60 percent rock and 40 percent ice. This was overturned by further radio Doppler observations on C9 and C10, which indicated that rock had settled towards the core, and therefore that Callisto indeed has a differentiated internal structure, although not as much so as the other Galilean moons.

Observations made with Galileo magnetometer indicated that Callisto had no magnetic field of its own, and therefore lacked an iron core like Ganymede's, but that it did have an induced field from Jupiter's magnetosphere. Because ice is too poor a conductor to generate this effect, it pointed to the possibility that Callisto, like Europa and Ganymede, might have a subsurface ocean of brine. Galileo made its closest encounter with Callisto on C30, when it made a  pass over the surface, during which it photographed the Asgard, Valhalla and Bran craters. This was used for slingshot maneuvers to set up the final encounters with Io on I31 and I32.

Amalthea

Although Galileo main mission was to explore the Galilean moons, it also captured images of four of the inner moons, Thebe, Adrastea,    Amalthea, and Metis. Such images were only possible from a spacecraft; to Earth-based telescopes they were merely specks of light. Two years of Jupiter's intense radiation took its toll on the spacecraft's systems, and its fuel supply was running low in the early 2000s. Galileo cameras were deactivated on January 17, 2002, after they had sustained irreparable radiation damage.

NASA engineers were able to recover the damaged tape recorder electronics, and Galileo continued to return scientific data until it was deorbited in 2003, performing one last scientific experiment: a measurement of Amalthea's mass as the spacecraft swung by it. This was tricky to arrange; to be useful, Galileo had to fly within  of Amalthea, but not so close as to crash into it. This was complicated by its irregular  potato-like shape. It was tidally locked, pointing its long axis towards Jupiter at all times. A successful flyby meant knowing which direction the asteroid was pointed in relative to Galileo at all times.

Galileo flew by Amalthea on November 5, 2002, during its 34th orbit, allowing a measurement of the moon's mass as it passed within  of its surface.

A final discovery occurred during the last two orbits of the mission. When the spacecraft passed the orbit of Amalthea, the star scanner detected unexpected flashes of light that were reflections from seven to nine moonlets. None of the individual moonlets were reliably sighted twice, so no orbits were determined. It is believed that they were most likely debris ejected from Amalthea and form a tenuous, and perhaps temporary, ring.

Star scanner
Galileo star scanner was a small optical telescope that provided an absolute attitude reference. It also made several scientific discoveries serendipitously. In the prime mission, it was found that the star scanner was able to detect high-energy particles as a noise signal. This data was eventually calibrated to show the particles were predominantly > electrons that were trapped in the Jovian magnetic belts, and released to the Planetary Data System.

A second discovery occurred in 2000. The star scanner was observing a set of stars which included the second magnitude star Delta Velorum. At one point, this star dimmed for 8 hours below the star scanner's detection threshold. Subsequent analysis of Galileo data and work by amateur and professional astronomers showed that Delta Velorum is the brightest known eclipsing binary, brighter at maximum than even Algol. It has a primary period of 45 days and the dimming is just visible with the naked eye.

Mission extension
After the primary mission concluded on December 7, 1997, most of the mission staff departed, including O'Neil, but about a fifth of them remained. The Galileo orbiter commenced an extended mission known as the Galileo Europa Mission (GEM), which ran until December 31, 1999. This was a low-cost mission, with a budget of $30 million (equivalent to $ million in ). The reason for calling it as the "Europa" mission rather than the "Extended" mission was political; although it might seem wasteful to scrap a spacecraft that was still functional and capable of performing a continuing mission, Congress took a dim view of requests for more money for projects it thought had already been fully funded. This was avoided through rebranding.

The smaller GEM team did not have the resources to deal with problems, but when they arose it was able to temporarily recall former team members for intensive efforts to solve them. The spacecraft performed several flybys of Europa, Callisto and Io. On each one the spacecraft collected only two days' worth of data instead of the seven it had collected during the prime mission. The radiation environment near Io, which Galileo approached to within  on November 26, 1999, on orbit I25, was very unhealthy for Galileo systems, and so these flybys were saved for the extended mission when loss of the spacecraft would be more acceptable.

By the time GEM ended, most of the spacecraft was operating well beyond its original design specifications, having absorbed three times the radiation exposure that it had been built to withstand. Many of the instruments were no longer operating at peak performance, but were still functional, so a second extension, the Galileo Millennium Mission (GMM) was authorized. This was intended to run until March 2001, but it was subsequently extended until January 2003. GMM included return visits to Europa, Io, Ganymede and Callisto, and for the first time to Amalthea. Of this,  (equivalent to $ million in ) was spent on spacecraft development. Another $110 million (equivalent to $ million in ) was contributed by international agencies.

Radiation-related anomalies

Jupiter's uniquely harsh radiation environment caused over 20 anomalies over the course of Galileo mission, in addition to the incidents expanded upon below. Despite having exceeded its radiation design limit by at least a factor of three, the spacecraft survived all these anomalies. Work-arounds were found eventually for all of these problems, and Galileo was never rendered entirely non-functional by Jupiter's radiation. The radiation limits for Galileo computers were based on data returned from Pioneers 10 and 11, since much of the design work was underway before the two Voyagers arrived at Jupiter in 1979.

The SSI camera began producing totally white images when the spacecraft was hit by the exceptional 'Bastille Day' coronal mass ejection in 2000, and did so again on subsequent close approaches to Jupiter. The quartz crystal used as the frequency reference for the radio suffered permanent frequency shifts with each Jupiter approach. A spin detector failed, and the spacecraft gyro output was biased by the radiation environment.

The most severe effects of the radiation were current leakages somewhere in the spacecraft's power bus, most likely across brushes at a spin bearing connecting rotor and stator sections of the orbiter. These current leakages triggered a reset of the onboard computer and caused it to go into safe mode. The resets occurred when the spacecraft was either close to Jupiter or in the region of space magnetically downstream of Jupiter. A change to the software was made in April 1999 that allowed the onboard computer to detect these resets and autonomously recover, so as to avoid safe mode.

Tape recorder problems
Routine maintenance of the tape recorder involved winding the tape halfway down its length and back again to prevent it sticking. In November 2002, after the completion of the mission's only encounter with Jupiter's moon Amalthea, problems with playback of the tape recorder again plagued Galileo. About 10 minutes after the closest approach of the Amalthea flyby, Galileo stopped collecting data, shut down all of its instruments, and went into safe mode, apparently as a result of exposure to Jupiter's intense radiation environment. Though most of the Amalthea data was already written to tape, it was found that the recorder refused to respond to commands telling it to play back data.

After weeks of troubleshooting of an identical flight spare of the recorder on the ground, it was determined that the cause of the malfunction was a reduction of light output in three infrared Optek OP133 light-emitting diodes (LEDs) located in the drive electronics of the recorder's motor encoder wheel. The gallium arsenide LEDs had been particularly sensitive to proton-irradiation-induced atomic lattice displacement defects, which greatly decreased their effective light output and caused the drive motor's electronics to falsely believe the motor encoder wheel was incorrectly positioned.

Galileo flight team then began a series of "annealing" sessions, where current was passed through the LEDs for hours at a time to heat them to a point where some of the crystalline lattice defects would be shifted back into place, thus increasing the LED's light output. After about 100 hours of annealing and playback cycles, the recorder was able to operate for up to an hour at a time. After many subsequent playback and cooling cycles, the complete transmission back to Earth of all recorded Amalthea flyby data was successful.

End of mission and deorbit

When the exploration of Mars was being considered in the early 1960s, Carl Sagan and Sidney Coleman produced a paper concerning contamination of the red planet. In order that scientists could determine whether or not native life forms existed before the planet became contaminated by micro-organisms from Earth, they proposed that space missions should aim at a 99.9 percent chance that contamination should not occur. This figure was adopted by the Committee on Space Research (COSPAR) of the International Council of Scientific Unions in 1964, and was subsequently applied to all planetary probes. The danger was highlighted in 1969 when the Apollo 12 astronauts returned components of the Surveyor 3 spacecraft that had landed on the Moon three years before, and it was found that microbes were still viable even after three years in that harsh climate. An alternative was the Prime Directive, a philosophy of non-interference with alien life forms enunciated by the original Star Trek television series that prioritized the interests of the life forms over those of scientists. Given the (admittedly slim) prospect of life on Europa, scientists Richard Greenberg and Randall Tufts proposed that a new standard be set of no greater chance of contamination than that which might occur naturally by meteorites.

Galileo had not been sterilized prior to launch and could have carried bacteria from Earth. Therefore, a plan was formulated to send the probe directly into Jupiter, in an intentional crash to eliminate the possibility of an impact with Jupiter's moons, particularly Europa, and prevent a forward contamination. On April 14, 2003, Galileo reached its greatest orbital distance from Jupiter for the entire mission since orbital insertion, before plunging back towards the gas giant for its final impact. At the completion of J35, its final orbit around the Jovian system, Galileo impacted Jupiter in darkness just south of the equator on September 21, 2003, at 18:57 UTC.

Major findings
 The composition of Jupiter differs from that of the Sun, indicating that Jupiter has evolved since the formation of the Solar System.
 Galileo made the first observation of ammonia clouds in another planet's atmosphere. The atmosphere creates ammonia ice particles from material coming up from lower depths.
 Io was confirmed to have extensive volcanic activity that is 100 times greater than that found on Earth. The heat and frequency of eruptions are reminiscent of early Earth.
 Complex plasma interactions in Io's atmosphere create immense electrical currents which couple to Jupiter's atmosphere.
 Several lines of evidence from Galileo support the theory that liquid oceans exist under Europa's icy surface.
 Ganymede possesses its own, substantial magnetic field – the first satellite known to have one.
 Galileo magnetic data provided evidence that Europa, Ganymede and Callisto have a liquid salt water layer under the visible surface.
 Evidence exists that Europa, Ganymede, and Callisto all have a thin atmospheric layer known as a "surface-bound exosphere".
 Jupiter's ring system is formed by dust kicked up as interplanetary meteoroids smash into the planet's four small inner moons. The outermost ring is actually two rings, one embedded with the other. There is probably a separate ring along Amalthea's orbit as well.
 The Galileo spacecraft identified the global structure and dynamics of a giant planet's magnetosphere.

Follow-on missions
There was a spare Galileo spacecraft that was considered by the NASA-ESA Outer Planets Study Team in 1983 for a mission to Saturn, but it was passed over in favor of a newer design, which became Cassini–Huygens. While Galileo was operating, Ulysses passed by Jupiter in 1992 on its mission to study the Sun's polar regions, and Cassini–Huygens coasted by the planet in 2000 and 2001 en route to Saturn. New Horizons passed close by Jupiter in 2007 for a gravity assist en route to Pluto, and it too collected data on the planet. The next mission to orbit Jupiter was the Juno spacecraft, which entered Jovian orbit in July 2016.

Juno
NASA's Juno spacecraft, launched in 2011 and planned for a two-year tour of the Jovian system, successfully completed Jupiter orbital insertion on July 4, 2016.

Jupiter Icy Moons Explorer
The European Space Agency is planning to return to the Jovian system with the Jupiter Icy Moons Explorer (JUICE), which is designed to orbit Ganymede in the 2030s.

Europa Clipper
Even before Galileo concluded, NASA considered the Europa Orbiter, which was a mission to Jupiter's moon Europa, but it was canceled in 2002. After its cancellation, a lower-cost version was studied. This led to the Europa Clipper being approved in 2015; it is currently planned for launch in the mid-2020s.

Europa Lander
A lander concept, simply called Europa Lander is being assessed by the Jet Propulsion Laboratory. , this lander mission to Europa remains a concept, although some funds have been released for instrument development and maturation.

Footnotes

Notes

References

 
 
 
 *

External links

 Galileo mission site by NASA's Solar System Exploration
 Galileo legacy site  by NASA's Solar System Exploration
 Galileo Satellite Image Mosaics by Arizona State University
 Galileo image album by Kevin M. Gill

Galileo program
Missions to Jupiter
Missions to main-belt asteroids
Galileo Galilei
Articles containing video clips